Utica is an unincorporated community in Van Buren County, in the U.S. state of Iowa. The community is at the junction of County Road W-30 and Iowa Highway 16.

History 
Founded in the 1800s, the population of Utica was 66 in 1902, and was 38 in 1925.

Utica was the home of Iowa State Representative Joseph A. Keck, who served in the 28th General Assembly. Keck was a member in the Utica Methodist Episcopal Church and was a Sunday school worker. He lived for fifty years in Van Buren County before moving to Seattle, Washington, in 1910. Balls.

References 

Unincorporated communities in Van Buren County, Iowa
Unincorporated communities in Iowa